1568 Aisleen, provisional designation , is a stony Phocaea asteroid from the inner regions of the asteroid belt, approximately 12.5 kilometers in diameter. It was discovered on 21 August 1946, by South African astronomer Ernest Johnson at Johannesburg Observatory in South Africa. It is named for the discoverer's wife, Aisleen Johnson.

Orbit and classification 

The S-type asteroid is a member of the Phocaea family, a group of asteroids with similar orbital characteristics. It orbits the Sun at a distance of 1.8–3.0 AU once every 3 years and 7 months (1,318 days). Its orbit has an eccentricity of 0.25 and an inclination of 25° with respect to the ecliptic. As no precoveries were taken, and no prior identifications were made, Aisleens observation arc begins with its official discovery observation at Johannesburg.

Physical characteristics

Rotation and pole 

In August 2000, a rotational lightcurve of Aisleen was obtained from photometric observations made by Glen Malcolm at the Roach Motel Observatory in California. The analysis gave a well-defined rotation period of 6.68 hours during which the brightness varied by 0.56 in magnitude. In April 2014, photometric observations by Brian D. Warner gave a period of 6.683 hours with an amplitude of 0.31 magnitude. A modeled lightcurve from various data sources gave a concurring period of 6.67597 hours and found a pole of (109°,−68°).

Diameter and albedo 

According to the surveys carried out by the Japanese Akari satellite and NASA's Wide-field Infrared Survey Explorer with its subsequent NEOWISE mission, Aisleen measures between 11.98 and 14.04 kilometers in diameter, and its surface has an albedo between 0.130 and 0.21. The Collaborative Asteroid Lightcurve Link assumes a standard albedo for Phocaea asteroids of 0.23 – derived from 25 Phocaea, the family's most massiv member and namesake – and calculates a diameter of 12.67 kilometers based on an absolute magnitude of 11.7.

Naming 

This minor planet was named by the discoverer for his wife, Aisleen Johnson. The official  was published by the Minor Planet Center on 31 January 1962.

References

External links 
 Asteroid Lightcurve Database (LCDB), query form (info )
 Dictionary of Minor Planet Names, Google books
 Asteroids and comets rotation curves, CdR – Observatoire de Genève, Raoul Behrend
 Discovery Circumstances: Numbered Minor Planets (1)-(5000) – Minor Planet Center
 
 

001568
Discoveries by Ernest Leonard Johnson
Named minor planets
19460821